The members of the 33rd Manitoba Legislature were elected in the Manitoba general election held in March 1986. The legislature sat from May 8, 1986, to March 9, 1988.

The New Democratic Party led by Howard Pawley formed the government.

Gary Filmon of the Progressive Conservative Party was Leader of the Opposition.

Myrna Phillips served as speaker for the assembly.

The government was defeated on March 8, 1988, when one of its members, Jim Walding, voted with the opposition against the budget.

Although the Pawley government had supported the Meech Lake Accord, a resolution on the Accord had not been put before the legislature before the government was defeated.

There were three sessions of the 33rd Legislature:

Pearl McGonigal was Lieutenant Governor of Manitoba until December 11, 1986, when George Johnson became lieutenant governor.

Members of the Assembly 
The following members were elected to the assembly in 1986:

Notes:

By-elections 
None

References 

Terms of the Manitoba Legislature
1986 establishments in Manitoba
1988 disestablishments in Manitoba